This is a list of cities, towns, villages and other populated places in the ceremonial county of Merseyside, England.

A
Aigburth -
Ainsdale -
Aintree -
Allerton -
Anfield

B
Barnston -
Bebington -
Beechwood -
Belle Vale -
Bidston -
Billinge -
Birkdale -
Birkenhead -
Blowick -
Blundellsands -
Bold -
Bootle -
Bowring Park -
Brighton le Sands -
Brimstage -
Broadgreen -
Bromborough -
Bromborough Pool

C
Caldy -
Canning -
Childwall -
Churchtown -
Claughton -
Clock Face -
Clubmoor -
Crank -
Cressington -
Crosby -
Crossens -
Croxteth -
Croxteth Park Estate

D
Dingle -
Dovecot

E
Earlestown -
Eastham -
Eccleston -
Eccleston Park -
Edge Hill -
Egremont -
Everton

F
Fairfield -
Fazakerley -
Ford -
Formby -
Frankby -
Freshfield

G
Garston -
Gateacre -
Gayton -
Gillmoss -
Golborne Dale -
Grange -
Grange Park -
Grassendale -
Greasby -
Great Altcar

H
Halewood -
Halsnead Park -
Haydock -
Heswall -
Higher Bebington -
Higher Tranmere -
Hightown -
Hillside -
Hoylake -
Hunts Cross -
Huyton

I
Ince Blundell -
Irby

K
Kensington -
Kings Moss -
Kirkby -
Kirkdale -
Knotty Ash -
Knowsley Village -
Knowsley Park

L
Landican -
Larton -
Leasowe -
Liscard -
Litherland -
Little Altcar -
Little Crosby -
Liverpool -
Lunt -
Lydiate

M
Maghull -
Marshside -
Melling -
Melling Mount -
Meols -
Moreton -
Mossley Hill

N
Netherley -
Netherton -
New Brighton -
New Ferry -
Newton -
Newton-le-Willows -
Noctorum -
Norris Green -

O
Oglet -
Old Roan -
Old Swan -
Orrell Park -
Oxton

P
Page Moss -
Parr -
Pensby -
Port Sunlight -
Poulton -
Prenton -
Prescot

R
Raby -
Raby Mere -
Rainford -
Rainhill -
Roby -
Rock Ferry

S
Saughall Massie -
Seacombe -
Seaforth -
Sefton -
Southport -
Speke -
Spital -
St Helens -
Stockbridge Village -
Stoneycroft -
Sutton Leach -
Sutton Manor

T
Tarbock -
Thatto Heath -
Thingwall -
Thornton -
Thornton Hough -
Thurstaston -
Toxteth -
Tranmere -
Tuebrook

U
Upton

V
Vauxhall

W
Waddicar -
Wallasey -
Wallasey Village -
Walton -
Waterloo -
Wavertree -
West Derby -
West Kirby -
Whiston -
Windle -
Woodchurch -
Woodvale -
Woolton

See also
List of places in England

Merseyside
Populated places in Merseyside
Merseyside-related lists